Leucine-rich repeats and death domain containing, also known as LRDD or p53-induced protein with a death domain (PIDD), is a protein which in humans is encoded by the LRDD gene.

Function 

The protein encoded by this gene contains a leucine-rich repeat and a death domain. This protein has been shown to interact with other death domain proteins, such as Fas (TNFRSF6)-associated via death domain (FADD) and MAP-kinase activating death domain-containing protein (MADD), and thus may function as an adaptor protein in cell death-related signaling processes. The expression of the mouse counterpart of this gene has been found to be positively regulated by the tumor suppressor p53 and to induce cell apoptosis in response to DNA damage, which suggests a role for this gene as an effector of p53-dependent apoptosis. Three alternatively spliced transcript variants encoding distinct isoforms have been reported. Besides its pro-apoptotic function it may also be involved in DNA repair as part of a protein complex formed together with the catalytic subunit of DNA-PK (DNA-PKcs)and caspase 2.

References

Further reading